Trunk Crime is a 1939 British thriller film directed by Roy Boulting and starring Manning Whiley, Barbara Everest and Michael Drake. It was made at Elstree Studios as a quota quickie. The film's sets were designed by Duncan Sutherland.

Cast

References

Bibliography
 Chibnall, Steve. Quota Quickies: The Birth of the British 'B' Film. British Film Institute, 2007.
 Low, Rachael. Filmmaking in 1930s Britain. George Allen & Unwin, 1985.
 Wood, Linda. British Films, 1927-1939. British Film Institute, 1986.

External links

1939 films
British thriller films
1930s thriller films
1930s English-language films
Films directed by Roy Boulting
Quota quickies
Films set in England
Films shot at Station Road Studios, Elstree
British black-and-white films
1930s British films